Globe Theatre was a theatre in London associated with William Shakespeare.

Globe Theatre may also refer to:
 Globe Theatre, Regina in Regina, Saskatchewan, Canada
 Globe Theatre, Dunedin, New Zealand
 Globe Theatre (Newcastle Street) (1868-1902), London, UK
 Gielgud Theatre was known as the Globe Theatre from 1909 to 1994, Shaftesbury Avenue, London, UK
 Shakespeare's Globe, London, UK
 Old Globe Theatre of San Diego, California, U.S.
 Globe Theatre, California, U.S., part of Universal Studios Hollywood
 Globe Theatre, Los Angeles, California, U.S.
 Globe Theatre, Boston (1871), Massachusetts, U.S.
 Globe Theatre, Boston (1903), Massachusetts, U.S.
 Lunt-Fontanne Theatre or Globe Theatre, New York, U.S. 
 New Theatre Comique, former theater in New York City
 Pop-up Globe, a theatre company that performed Shakespeare plays in a temporary, full-scale touring replica of the Globe Theatre

See also
 Globe of the Great Southwest, Odessa, Texas 

Lists of theatres